A penumbral lunar eclipse will occur on Tuesday, March 4, 2053.

Visibility 

The entire eclipse will be visible in Asia and Australia. Most or some of the eclipse will be visible in Europe, Africa, and the remainder of Oceania.

This lunar eclipse will be followed by the solar eclipse of March 20, 2053.

Related lunar eclipses 
This lunar eclipse is part of Lunar Saros 114.

Lunar year series

See also 
List of lunar eclipses and List of 21st-century lunar eclipses

External links 
 

2053-03
2053-03
2053 in science